France participated in the Eurovision Song Contest 2005 with the song "Chacun pense à soi" written by Ortal and Saad Tabainet. The song was performed by Ortal. The French broadcaster France Télévisions in collaboration with the television channel France 3 organised the national final Un candidat pour l’Eurovision in order to select the French entry for the 2005 contest in Kyiv, Ukraine. Five songs competed in the national final on 15 March 2005 where "Chacun pense à soi" performed by Ortal was selected as the winner following the combination of votes from a five-member jury panel and a public vote.

As a member of the "Big Four", France automatically qualified to compete in the final of the Eurovision Song Contest. Performing as the closing entry during the show in position 24, France placed twenty-third out of the 24 participating countries with 11 points.

Background 

France first won the contest in 1958 with "Dors, mon amour" performed by André Claveau. In the 1960s, they won three times, with "Tom Pillibi" performed by Jacqueline Boyer in 1960, "Un premier amour" performed by Isabelle Aubret in 1962 and "Un jour, un enfant" performed by Frida Boccara, who won in 1969 in a four-way tie with the Netherlands, Spain and the United Kingdom. France's fifth victory came in 1977, when Marie Myriam won with the song "L'oiseau et l'enfant". France have also finished second four times, with Paule Desjardins in 1957, Catherine Ferry in 1976, Joëlle Ursull in 1990 and Amina in 1991, who lost out to Sweden's Carola in a tie-break. In the 21st century, France has had less success, only making the top ten two times, with Natasha St-Pier finishing fourth in 2001 and Sandrine François finishing fifth in 2002. In 2004, the nation finished in fifteenth place with the song "À chaque pas" performed by Jonatan Cerrada.

The French national broadcaster, France Télévisions, broadcasts the event within France and delegates the selection of the nation's entry to the television channel France 3. France 3 confirmed that France would participate in the 2005 Eurovision Song Contest on 31 August 2004. The French broadcaster had used both national finals and internal selection to choose the French entry in the past. From 2001 to 2004, the broadcaster opted to internally select the French entry. In January 2005, the broadcaster announced that the 2005 French entry would be selected via a national final that would feature five competing acts. This marked the first time since 2000 that a national final would be organised to select the French entry.

Before Eurovision

Un candidat pour l'Eurovision
Un candidat pour l'Eurovision was the national final organised by France 3 to select France's entry for the Eurovision Song Contest 2005. The competition took place on 15 March 2005 at the La Plaine St-Denis TV Studios in Paris, hosted by Laurent Ruquier and Elsa Fayer. The show was broadcast on France 3. The national final was watched by 2 million viewers in France with a market share of 12.4%.

Competing entries 
France 3 opened a submission period on 11 January 2005 in order for record companies to submit their proposals up until the deadline on 31 January 2005. At the closing of the deadline, the French broadcaster received 13 submissions. A selection committee consisting of representatives of France 3 reviewed the received submissions and selected five entries to compete in the national final. The competing artists were announced on 17 February 2005. On 11 March 2005, the competing songs were previewed online and formally presented to the public on 17 February 2005 during an introductory documentary that also covered the entries selection process for the national final.

Final 
The final took place on 15 March 2005. The show consisted of two parts: in the first part each of the five finalists performed a duet with a well-known artist and in the second part the five contest entries were performed. For the duet round, Lionel Tim performed together with Lara Fabian, Ortal performed together with Liane Foly, Christophe Héraut performed together with Hélène Segara, Marjorie Galluccio performed together with Julie Zenatti, and Karine Trecy performed together with Lââm. The winner, "Chacun pense à soi" performed by Ortal, was determined by the combination of public televoting (50%) and a five-member jury panel (50%). The jury panel consisted of Jean-Claude Camus (producer), Dominique Segall (press agency director), Miroslava Brimont (vocal coach), Bertrand Mosca (France 3 programmes director) and Jean-Michel Boris (former director of L'Olympia).

In addition to the performances of the competing entries, Liane Foly performed the French Eurovision Song Contest 1977 winning song "L'oiseau et l'enfant" by Marie Myriam as the interval act of the show.

At Eurovision
According to Eurovision rules, all nations with the exceptions of the host country, the "Big Four" (France, Germany, Spain and the United Kingdom) and the ten highest placed finishers in the 2004 contest are required to qualify from the semi-final in order to compete for the final; the top ten countries from the semi-final progress to the final. As a member of the "Big 4", France automatically qualified to compete in the final on 21 May 2005. In addition to their participation in the final, France is also required to broadcast and vote in the semi-final on 19 May 2005. During the running order draw for the semi-final and final, France was placed to perform last in position 24 in the final, following the entry from Latvia. Ortal performed the song on stage with five backing vocalists/dancers: Fabien Hannot, Raphael Kaney, Julie Victor, Christelle Chaaban and Marsha Nelzy, and France placed twenty-third in the final, scoring 11 points.

In France, the semi-final was broadcast on France 4 with commentary by Peggy Olmi, while the final was broadcast on France 3 with commentary by Julien Lepers and Guy Carlier, as well as via radio on France Bleu with commentary by Jean-Luc Delarue. The French spokesperson, who announced the French votes during the final, was Eurovision Song Contest 1977 winner Marie Myriam.

Voting 
Below is a breakdown of points awarded to France and awarded by France in the semi-final and grand final of the contest. The nation awarded its 12 points to Portugal in the semi-final and to Turkey in the final of the contest.

Points awarded to France

Points awarded by France

References

External links
French National Final page

2005
Countries in the Eurovision Song Contest 2005
Eurovision
Eurovision